Vanessa Foliaki (born 20 August 1993) is a New Zealand-born Australian rugby league footballer who plays for the Sydney Roosters in the NRL Women's Premiership and the Wentworthville Magpies in the NSWRL Women's Premiership. 

Primarily a er, she has represented Australia and New South Wales.

Background
Born in Auckland, Foliaki grew up in Māngere, where she played rugby union before moving to Australia in 2010.

Playing career
In Australia, Foliaki first played rugby league for the Orange Hawks. In 2014, Foliaki joined the Canley Vale Dragons in Sydney, and was selected to represent Australia and New South Wales. In 2016, Foliaki moved to Queensland, joining the Burleigh Bears.

In 2017, Foliaki and teammates Karina Brown and Sasha Mahuika left Burleigh to form the Easts Tigers women's team. In December 2017, she was a member of Australia's 2017 Women's Rugby League World Cup-winning squad.

2018
In June, Foliaki represented NSW Country at the Women's National Championships. In July, she joined the Sydney Roosters NRL Women's Premiership team. 

In Round 1 of the 2018 NRL Women's season, Foliaki made her debut for the Sydney Roosters, starting at second-row in their 4–10 loss to the New Zealand Warriors. On 30 September, she started at second-row in the Roosters' 12–34 Grand Final loss to the Brisbane Broncos.

2019
On 21 June, Foliaki came off the bench in New South Wales' 14–4 State of Origin win over Queensland at North Sydney Oval. She played three games for the Roosters during their winless 2019 NRL Women's season.

2020
In 2020, Foliaki joined the Mounties RLFC NSWRL Women's Premiership team before moving to the Wentworthville Magpies in August.

2022 
In early June 2022, the Parramatta Eels announced that Foliaki had signed to play for the club in the 2022 NRL Women's season.

Achievements and accolades

Team
2017 Women's Rugby League World Cup: Australia – Winners

References

External links
Sydney Roosters profile

1993 births
Living people
New Zealand sportspeople of Tongan descent
New Zealand female rugby league players
Australian female rugby league players
Australia women's national rugby league team players
Rugby league second-rows
Rugby league props
Sydney Roosters (NRLW) players
Rugby league players from Auckland
People from Māngere